The French submarine Orion was a submarine built for the French Navy between 1928 and 1931. Ordered in December 1927, it was laid down in July 1929, launched in April 1931 and commissioned in July 1932. On 3 July 1940, it was seized by the British while in Portsmouth. Orion was stricken in April 1943 and dismantled for spare parts.

Design
Propulsion while surfaced was provided by two  diesel motors and two  electric motors.

References 

World War II submarines of France
Orion-class submarines
1931 ships